Youth Square, formerly known as Hong Kong Centre for Youth Development is a youth activities complex in Hong Kong. It is located at 238 Chai Wan Road, Chai Wan on Hong Kong Island. It is owned by Home Affairs Bureau of Hong Kong Government.  The construction of Youth Square commenced in June 2001 and was completed in November 2008. The building is managed and operated by New World Facilities Management Company Limited since 2010.

Events 
Youth Square has been conducting a range of activities for the youth under the theme of "Music & Dance”, “Arts & Culture” and “Community Engagement”.

Y Loft 

Y Loft is located in Youth Square's Main Block and Hostel Block, which directly connected to MTR Chai Wan station (Exit A) via a footbridge.

It also offers concession rate to youth organization or youth activities held by non-profit organization or International Student Identity Card (ISIC) and International Youth Travel Card (IYTC) members.

References

External links 

 
 Y Loft Website
 Youth Square's Events
 Tripadvisor Y Loft

Buildings and structures in Hong Kong
Chai Wan
Music venues in Hong Kong